Karen Bethzabe is a Mexican actress, best known for her role on Fear the Walking Dead.

Career
Bethzabe most notable role was on the AMC television show Fear the Walking Dead, as Elena Reyes a zombie apocalypse survivor who had to make a terrible decision.

Television audiences first got to know Karen after landing the role of Paulette Vazquez in the CBS show CSI, and as Eufemia Garcia in the Freeform series Switched at Birth. She has also emerged in numerous indie films, including producing and starring in the film Death and Cremation alongside Oscar nominee Brad Dourif and in Erahm Christopher's debut feature film LISTEN.

Filmography

Film

Television

References

External links
 

21st-century American actresses
American television actresses
Living people
21st-century Mexican actresses
Mexican television actresses
Year of birth missing (living people)